Mattia Zanotti (born 11 January 2003) is an Italian professional footballer who plays as a right-back for Serie A club Inter Milan.

Club career
Zanotti is a youth product of Virtus Feralpi Lonato and Brescia, before moving to Inter Milan's youth academy in 2017. On 1 October 2021, Zanotti signed a professional contract with Inter Milan, tying him to the club until 2024. He made his Serie A debut for Inter Milan in a 4–0 win over Cagliari on 12 December 2021, coming on as a substitute in the 83rd minute.

International career
Zanotti is a youth international for Italy, having represented the Italy U15s, U16s, U17s and U19s.

Honours 
Inter Milan

 Supercoppa Italiana: 2022

References

External links
 
 Inter Profile
 Serie A Profile

2003 births
Living people
Footballers from Brescia
Association football fullbacks
Italian footballers
Italy youth international footballers
Inter Milan players
Serie A players